The International Flame Research Foundation – IFRF is a non-profit research association and network created in 1948 in IJmuiden (Netherlands), established in Livorno (Italy) between 2005 and 2016 (Fondazione Internazionale per la Ricerca Sulla Combustione – ONLUS), and in Sheffield (UK) since 2017. Meredith Thring was one of the founders.

The IFRF Membership Network unites some 1000 combustion researchers from 130 industrial companies and academic institutions worldwide, around a common interest in efficient and environmentally responsible industrial combustion, with a focus on flame studies.

History 
The IFRF can be traced to a proposal written in 1948 by Meredith Thring, head of the Physics Department in the newly formed British Iron and Steel Research Association (BISRA). Entitled Proposals for the Establishment of an International Research Project on Luminous Radiation, the document resulted in the formation of the International Flame Radiation Research Committee with representatives of the steel, fuel and appliance making industries in France, Holland and England - specifically the British Iron and Steel Research Association (BISRA), the Iron and Steel Research Association of France (IRSID) and the Royal Dutch Iron and Steel Company (KNHS).

Publications 
The IFRF is the publisher of technical reports and regular publications:
 The Industrial Combustion Journal since 1999, named IFRF Combustion Journal between Sept. 1999 and Aug. 2009,
 The Monday Night Mail - MNM - since 1999, in 1998 a few numbers of the IFRF Newsletter were also published,
 The Combustion Handbook since 2001.
Theses publications are freely available on-line.

Events 
The IFRF organises events to disseminate knowledge on combustion.

Topic Oriented Technical Meetings (TOTeM) 
TOTeMs are organized since 1989, once or twice a year:

IFRF Conferences 
IFRF Conferences (formerly Members Conference) are organized approximately every two or three years:

Structure 
The IFRF is organised in 9 national committee plus the Associate Member Group (AMG) where no national committee exists.

Committees 
 American Flame Research Committee - AFRC
 British Flame Research Committee - BFRC
 Chinese Flame Research Committee - CFRC
 Finnish Flame Research Committee - FFRC
 French Flame (Comité français) - CF
 German Flame (Deutsche Vereinigung für Verbrennungsforschung e.V.) - DVV
 Italian Flame (Comitato Italiano) - CI
 Dutch Flame (Nederlandse Vereniging voor Vlamonderzoek) - NVV
 Swedish Flame Research Committee - SFRC

Governance 
The IFRF in managed by a Council and an Executive Committee.

Locations 
From 1948 to 2005 the IFRF facilities were located in the CORUS R&D centre at IJmuiden (Netherlands).

In 2005, the research station was relocated at ENEL facilities in Livorno (Italy), the measurement programme was restarted November 27, 2006.

In 2015 a relocation of the IFRF headquarters process was initiated. Leading to the designation of University of Sheffield and its PACT  laboratory as the new IFRF location from 2017.

See also 
 The Combustion Institute, a network of researchers specialised in combustion mainly from academia.

References

External links

International scientific organizations
Research institutes in Italy
Scientific organizations established in 1948
Combustion